Biggleton is a British children's television series, produced by and for the BBC channel CBeebies, and narrated by Eamonn Holmes in series one, and John Gordon Sinclair in series two.

References

External links 
 

British preschool education television series
Television series by BBC Studios
CBeebies